Hypatopa ursella is a moth in the family Blastobasidae. It is found in the United States, including California.

The wingspan is about 18 mm. The forewings are bone-white, suffused and sprinkled with brownish gray. The hindwings are pale gray with a slight brownish tinge.

References

Moths described in 1907
Hypatopa